The 2018 Music City Bowl was a college football bowl game played on December 28, 2018 at Nissan Stadium in Nashville, Tennessee. It was the 21st edition of the Music City Bowl, and one of the 2018–19 bowl games concluding the 2018 FBS football season. Sponsored by the Franklin American Mortgage Company, the game was officially known as the Franklin American Mortgage Music City Bowl.

Despite being projected as a close game, Auburn was able create an early 21–0 lead. Purdue then put a touchdown on the board to make it 21–7, but Auburn then scored 35 unanswered points to end the half. The halftime score was 56–7, with Auburn setting the NCAA FBS record for points scored in any half of a bowl game. The final score of the game was 63–14.

Teams
The game was played between Purdue from the Big Ten Conference and Auburn from the Southeastern Conference (SEC). The teams had never played each other before.

Purdue Boilermakers

Purdue received and accepted a bid to the Music City Bowl on December 2. The Boilermakers entered the bowl with a 6–6 record (5–4 in conference).

This game was the last attended by Purdue superfan Tyler Trent, who had become a national inspiration during his battle with terminal osteosarcoma. He and his family traveled to Nashville on an airplane normally used by the Indianapolis Colts, courtesy of team owner Jim Irsay. Trent, who served as an honorary Purdue captain for the game, died four days later on New Year's Day.

Auburn Tigers

Auburn received and accepted a bid to the Music City Bowl on December 2. The Tigers entered the bowl with a 7–5 record (3–5 in conference).

Game summary

Scoring summary

Statistics

References

External links

Box score at ESPN

Music City Bowl
Music City Bowl
Music City Bowl
Music City Bowl
Purdue Boilermakers football bowl games
Auburn Tigers football bowl games